The Brazilian Jazz Quartet was an underground Brazilian jazz quartet from the late 1950s featuring Moacyr Peixoto (piano), José Ferreira Godinho Filho "Casé"  (alto sax), Rubens Alberto Barsotti "Rubinho" (drums) e Luiz Chaves Oliveira da Paz "Luiz Chaves" (bass).

History
The Brazilian Jazz Quartet was an underground Brazilian jazz quartet from the late 1950s featuring Moacyr Peixoto) (Piano), José Ferreira Godinho Filho "Casé" (Alto Sax), Rubens Alberto Barsotti "Rubinho" (Drums), and Luiz Chaves Oliveira da Paz "Luiz Chaves" (Bass). As a matter of fact, this group should be considered as a sort of embryo of the legendary Zimbo Trio.

The band released one album in 1958, called Coffee and Jazz

Discography 
 Coffee and Jazz (Columbia Records, 1958)

References 

Música popular brasileira musical groups
Brazilian jazz ensembles
Musical quartets
Bossa nova
Musical groups established in 1958
1958 establishments in Brazil